Terrimonas lutea is a bacterium from the genus of Terrimonas which has been isolated from soil from a garden in Japan.

References

External links
Type strain of Terrimonas lutea at BacDive -  the Bacterial Diversity Metadatabase

Chitinophagia
Bacteria described in 2006